Shadian District is in Charuymaq County, East Azerbaijan province, Iran. At the 2006 National Census, its population was 12,785 in 2,202 households. The following census in 2011 counted 12,404 people in 2,853 households. At the latest census in 2016, the district had 11,367 inhabitants, 3,214 households, and no cities.

References 

Charuymaq County

Districts of East Azerbaijan Province

Populated places in East Azerbaijan Province

Populated places in Charuymaq County